Suvorove is a village (a selo) in the Pokrovsk Raion (district) of Donetsk Oblast in eastern Ukraine. 

Until 18 July 2020, Suvorove belonged to Dobropillia Raion. The raion was abolished that day as part of the administrative reform of Ukraine, which reduced the number of raions of Donetsk Oblast to eight, of which only five were controlled by the government. The Dobropillia Raion was merged into Pokrovsk Raion.

References

Villages in Pokrovsk Raion